Samir Ujkani (born 5 July 1988) is a Kosovar Albanian professional footballer who plays as a goalkeeper for Italian club Empoli and the Kosovo national team.

Early life
Ujkani was born in Resnik, a village near Vushtrri, SAP Kosovo, SR Serbia, at the time part of the Socialist Federal Republic of Yugoslavia. His family then moved to Belgium six years after his birth.

Club career

Youth clubs
At the age of thirteen, Ujkani enrolled into Ingelmunster, spending six years there before moving to Anderlecht. The Anderlecht football academy has a reputation of producing talented goalkeepers such as Jacky Munaron. Ujkani played until June 2007 for the Anderlecht Under-19s, and made also ten appearances with their reserves team. In June 2007, he agreed to sign a five-year contract with Palermo of Italy's Serie A.

Palermo
Since then, Ujkani served as unused substitute in two UEFA Cup matches for Palermo, and several Serie A matches as well. He was confirmed as third-choice goalkeeper for the Rosanero's 2008–09 season, and later promoted as second goalkeeper after the club chose to transfer-list veteran goalkeeper Alberto Fontana.

On 26 April 2009, Ujkani made his professional debut with Palermo, replacing injured Marco Amelia during a Serie A match against Milan at the San Siro. His performance was congratulated from Kaká at the end of the match. In July 2009, he was loaned out to Lega Pro Prima Divisione club Novara in exchange with Giacomo Brichetto, also in order to gain first team experience.

On 14 June 2012, Palermo owner Maurizio Zamparini confirmed that Ujkani will be playing on Palermo for the 2012–13 season. On 22 June 2012, Palermo announced from their website to have re-acquired the full transfer rights of Ujkani and fellow Novara player Michel Morganella.

For Palermo's 2013–14 season, spent in Serie B after its previous season's relegation, he was used as a second-choice goalkeeper – receiving playing time – and being praised for his development relative to his previous stint with Palermo. During December and January 2014, he became temporary first-choice to cover for the injured Stefano Sorrentino. His contract with Palermo expired 30 June 2015.

Loan at Novara
Ujkani immediately cemented his place as Novara's first-choice goalkeeper. He was a pivotal and influential member of squad, helping promote Novara from the Lega Pro Prima Divisione to the Serie B in the 2009–10 season, marking a 33-year return for the club to Serie B. This prompted Novara to ask for an extension to his loan, which was agreed by Palermo in July 2010.

Ujkani helped Novara reach promotion in 2010–11 to Serie A after a 55-year absence. On 31 January 2011, Palermo announced it had sold 50% of Ujkani's transfer rights to Novara, along with Michel Morganella (both tagged for €1.5 million), as part of a bid involving striker Pablo González (€5 million).

Ujkani has been a crucial member of the squad in the Serie A, helping Novara beat Internazionale home and away when Ujkani pulled off a point-blank save to deny Giampaolo Pazzini and held off Wesley Sneijder when he struck the free-kick from a dangerous position. He also helped Novara secure a draw against Napoli.

From 16 October 2011, Ujkani sustained a broken nose and lost four teeth when he collided with teammate Michel Morganella against Bologna. Being one of the fan favourites, then Andrea Ballarè, the Mayor of Novara visited Ujkani in hospital. Ujkani returned on 5 December in a match against Lazio.

Loan at Chievo
After the arrival of goalkeeper Stefano Sorrentino at Palermo, Ujkani moved on loan to Chievo on 29 January 2013. In his short stint there, he did not play a single game, serving as back-up to Christian Puggioni, and was not acquired by the Verona-based club, thus making his return to Palermo by the end of season.

Genoa
On 19 July 2015, Genoa announced the signing of Ujkani on a free transfer, he did not play a single game.

Loan at Latina
On 8 January 2016, Ujkani joined Serie B side Latina on loan. On 16 January 2016, he made his debut in a 1–0 home defeat against former club Novara after being named in the starting line-up.

Loan at Pisa
On 11 July 2016, Ujkani joined Serie B side Pisa on loan. On 7 August 2016, he made his debut with Pisa in the second round of 2016–17 Coppa Italia against Brescia after being named in the starting line-up.

Cremonese
On 14 July 2017. Ujkani signed with the newly promoted team of Serie B side Cremonese. On 6 August 2017, he made his debut with Cremonese in the second round of 2017–18 Coppa Italia against Virtus Entella after being named in the starting line-up.

Çaykur Rizespor
On 18 July 2018. Ujkani signed with the newly promoted team of Süper Lig side Çaykur Rizespor, on a three-year contract. On 26 September 2018, he made his debut for Çaykur Rizespor in the third round of the 2018–19 Turkish Cup against Tarsus Idman Yurdu after being named in the starting line-up.

From the beginning of 2019, Ujkani was excluded from the first team squad alongside 4 other foreign players and moved down to the U21 squad.

International career

Albania
Ujkani received an Albanian passport in summer 2007 and started playing for the Albania U21. He made his debut on 1 June in a European qualification match against Italy U21. On 6 October 2008, he received his first senior call-up for the 2010 FIFA World Cup qualification qualifying matches with Hungary and Portugal. He made his full senior debut on 10 June 2009 in a 1–1 draw with Georgia in Albania. Ujkani lost his starting place to Etrit Berisha during the 2014 World Cup qualification.

Kosovo
On 2 March 2014. Ujkani received a call-up from Kosovo for the first permitted by FIFA match against Haiti and made his debut after being named in the starting line-up.

Career statistics

Club

International

References

External links

1988 births
Living people
Sportspeople from Vushtrri
Kosovo Albanians
Association football goalkeepers
Kosovan footballers
Kosovo international footballers
Albanian footballers
Albania international footballers
Albania under-21 international footballers
Dual internationalists (football)
R.S.C. Anderlecht players
Palermo F.C. players
Novara F.C. players
A.C. ChievoVerona players
Genoa C.F.C. players
Latina Calcio 1932 players
Pisa S.C. players
U.S. Cremonese players
Çaykur Rizespor footballers
Torino F.C. players
Empoli F.C. players
Serie A players
Serie B players
Serie C players
Süper Lig players
Kosovan expatriate footballers
Expatriate footballers in Belgium
Kosovan expatriate sportspeople in Belgium
Expatriate footballers in Italy
Kosovan expatriate sportspeople in Italy
Expatriate footballers in Turkey
Kosovan expatriate sportspeople in Turkey